Highway 229 (AR 229, Ark. 229, and Hwy. 229) is a , |north–south state highway in Dallas, Grant, and Saline counties in Arkansas, United States. The route begins at Highway 8 near Fordyce and runs north to South Drive in Benton. The highway was created on July 10, 1957 during a period of highway system expansion, and extended throughout the 1960s. The route is maintained by the Arkansas Department of Transportation (ArDOT). A small portion of the route is designated as an Arkansas Heritage Trail for its use during the Civil War.

Route description
Highway 229 connects Fordyce, a regional population center in South Arkansas with Benton, which is on the outskirts of Central Arkansas. However, it is less direct then US 167 between the cities. Traveling Highway 9 and Interstate 30 between the cities is also less direct than Highway 229, but both routes are estimated to have a shorter travel time than Highway 229 under normal conditions. The route is a rural, two-lane road its entire length. Dallas and Grant counties are both within the Arkansas Timberlands region, known for silviculture, vast farms of tall pine trees, small towns, and sparse rural population.

The route begins at Highway 8 in Fordyce in the northwest corner of the city. The route runs north to a junction with Highway 273, which runs east to US 167. Highway 229 continues north to Bunn, where it curves into a straight alignment along an abandoned railroad line to Carthage. In Carthage, the highway  passes the Bank of Carthage, which is listed on the National Register of Historic Places, and has a brief overlap with Highway 48. The route winds north to Cooney and enters Grant County.

Highway 229 runs north along the western side of Grant County, passing through Leola, where it has a brief concurrency with Highway 46. Northeast of Leola, Jenkins' Ferry Battleground State Park commemorates the Battle of Jenkins' Ferry during the Civil War. The highway runs north to Carvers, where it serves as the eastern terminus of Highway 222. Continuing north to Poyen Highway 229 intersects US 270, which gives access to Malvern to the west and Sheridan and Pine Bluff to the east. Highway 229 winds north through the communities of Fenter, Nydia, Traskwood, and Haskell. An overlap begins with US 67 in Haskell, which continues to I-30 in a discontinuous section of Benton. I-30 and US 67 concur to the north, with Highway 229 through a rural area until terminating at South Drive near the I-30/US 67 southbound frontage road.

History
The route was designated by the Arkansas State Highway Commission on July 10, 1957, during a period of expansion in the state highway system. The Arkansas General Assembly passed the Act 148 of 1957, the Milum Road Act, creating  of new state highways in each county.

The initial designation was from Carthage to US 67, and the route followed the Chicago, Rock Island and Pacific Railroad.  Between Leola and Poyen, the designation supplanted Highway 113. It was extended south from Carthage to Hughes Trail in April 1963. The route was extended to the current southern terminus in November 1966. At the request of the Grant and Saline county judges, the former alignment of US 67 was designated as Highway 229 on August 30, 1995. In exchange, Highway 291 between Tull and Traskwood was removed from the state highway system and returned to county maintenance.

The segment of Highway 229 north of I-30 is an Arkansas Heritage Trail, used during the Civil War by Union General Frederick Steele to approach the Confederate States of America army in the Camden Expedition.

Major intersections

See also

 List of state highways in Alabama

Notes

References

External links

229
Transportation in Dallas County, Arkansas
Transportation in Grant County, Arkansas
Transportation in Saline County, Arkansas
Arkansas Heritage Trails System